Brigitte Gothière (born 18 May 1973) is a French animal rights activist, spokesperson and director of the animal rights organization L214, which she co-founded with her husband Sébastien Arsac. She was also the editor of the journal Cahiers antispécistes from 1998 to 2019.

Biography 
Gothière was born on 18 May 1973; her mother was a nurse and her father, an electrical engineer. She studied mathematics and electronics in higher education. In 1993, when she was a student, she decided to stop eating meat, as well as any animal products. After graduation, she taught at a vocational high school and taught applied physics in Lyon.

With a few activists, in 2003, she launched the "Stop Gavage" collective, which fights against the force-feeding of geese and ducks. This led to the establishment, in 2008, of the animal rights association L214, which disseminates shocking images of slaughterhouses to raise awareness of the animal cause; Gothière is the spokesperson and director. She has argued that "only a vegan society would amount to success", but that small steps are progress.

Gothière was an editor of antispeciesist journal Cahiers antispécistes, from 1998 to the end of its publication in 2019.

She is married to Sébastien Arsac, who is also an animal activist; the couple has two children, who are also vegan.

See also
 List of animal rights advocates

References 

1973 births
Living people
French activists
French animal rights activists
French editors
French veganism activists
French women activists
French women editors
Organization founders